Sveta Katarina may refer to several places in Slovenia: 

Čeče, a settlement in the municipalities of Trbovlje and Hrastnik, known as Sveta Katarina until 1955
Kamence, Rogaška Slatina, a settlement in the Municipality of Rogaška Slatina, known as Sveta Katarina until 1953
Topol pri Medvodah, a settlement in the Municipality of Medvode, known as (Sveta) Katarina nad Medvodami until 1955